Aristopus is a genus of beetles in the family Carabidae, containing the following species:

 Aristopus angolanus (Straneo, 1948)
 Aristopus basilewskyi (Straneo, 1948)
 Aristopus bicolor (Straneo, 1948)
 Aristopus binotatus (Jeannel, 1948)
 Aristopus bipustulatus (Brulle, 1834)
 Aristopus collarti (Straneo, 1948)
 Aristopus decorus (Straneo, 1956)
 Aristopus distigma (Tschitscherine, 1898)
 Aristopus elisabethanus (Burgeon, 1935)
 Aristopus immaculatus (Jeannel, 1948)
 Aristopus lamottei (Straneo, 1963)
 Aristopus longicornis (Peringuey, 1899)
 Aristopus maculatus (Straneo, 1939)
 Aristopus minor (Straneo, 1951)
 Aristopus mirei Straneo, 1983
 Aristopus mocquerysi (Jeannel, 1948)
 Aristopus nairobianus (Straneo, 1948)
 Aristopus natalensis Straneo, 1983
 Aristopus punctatellus Straneo, 1983
 Aristopus puncticollis (Straneo, 1959)
 Aristopus robustus (Straneo, 1951)
 Aristopus submarginatus (Straneo, 1963)
 Aristopus trimaculatus Laferte-Senectere, 1853
 Aristopus ugandanus (Straneo, 1948)

References

Pterostichinae